The Roman Catholic Diocese of Kaya is a diocese located in the city of Kaya in the Ecclesiastical province of Koupéla in Burkina Faso.

History
 26 June 1969: Established as Diocese of Kaya from the Diocese of Koupéla and Metropolitan Archdiocese of Ouagadougou

Bishops
 Bishop Constantin Guirma (26 June 1969 – 9 March 1996)
 Bishop Jean-Baptiste Tiendrebeogo (30 March 1996 – 14 May 1998)
 Bishop Thomas Kaboré (19 April 1999 – 7 December 2018)
 Bishop Théophile Nare (7 December 2018 -)

Other priest of this diocese who became bishop
Philippe Nakellentuba Ouédraogo, appointed Bishop of Ouahigouya in 1996; future Cardinal

See also
Roman Catholicism in Burkina Faso

References

External links
 GCatholic.org

Roman Catholic dioceses in Burkina Faso
Christian organizations established in 1969
Roman Catholic dioceses and prelatures established in the 20th century
Kaya, Roman Catholic Diocese of